The 19th Annual American Music Awards were held on January 27, 1992, at the Shrine Auditorium, in Los Angeles, California. The awards recognized the most popular artists and albums from the year 1991.

C+C Music Factory were the most nominated and the big winners of the night, winning five out of the 6 trophies they were up to. Pop star Michael Bolton, soul's Luther Vandross and Natalie Cole each garnered two awards.

Performances

Notes
  Pre-taped in Las Vegas, Nevada.

Winners and nominees

References

1992